Motherwell competed in the Scottish Premier League, Scottish Cup, Scottish League Cup and UEFA Europa League during the 2009–10 season.

Important events

 30 June 2009 – Jim Gannon appointed new manager of the club, after he was made redundant by English League One side, Stockport
 2 July 2009 – First competitive match of the season against Welsh Premier League side, Llanelli in the first qualifying round of the UEFA Europa League, a 1–0 defeat at Fir Park
 6 August 2009 – Motherwell are eliminated from the UEFA Europa League in the third qualifying round by Steaua Bucharest
 15 August 2009 – The first Scottish Premier League fixture of the season (against St Johnstone) ends in a 2–2 draw at McDiarmid Park
 28 December 2009 – Jim Gannon is sacked by the board following continuous refusals to sign a contract with the club
 29 December 2009 – Craig Brown is hired to fill the void as caretaker manager until a replacement for Gannon can be found
 18 January 2010 – Motherwell are knocked out of the Scottish Cup after just one game, a 2–0 defeat to Inverness in the 4th round
 23 March 2010 – Both St Johnstone and Falkirk play out a 1–1 draw, which confirms Motherwell's place in the top-six of the Scottish Premier League
 5 May 2010 – Motherwell play their last home fixture of the year at Fir Park, a 6–6 draw with Hibernian, and break the league record for most goals in a single game
 5 May 2010 – Hearts play out a 0–0 draw confirming a minimum finish of 5th place for Motherwell
 9 May 2010 – A final day draw away to Rangers sees Motherwell fall just short of automatic qualification to the Europa League as Hibernian win at Tannadice
 15 May 2010 – Dundee United win the Scottish Cup: Motherwell qualify for the 2010–11 UEFA Europa League second qualifying round.

Transfers

For a list of Scottish football transfers in 2009–10, see transfers in season 2009–10

Summer transfer window (1 July – 1 September 2009)

In permanent

Loans in

Loans out

Out permanent

Winter transfer window (1 January – 2 February 2010)

In permanent

Loans in

Loans out

Out permanent

First-team squad

Updated 5 December 2010

Statistics

Appearances
Updated 5 December 2010

|}

Top scorers

Last updated on 5 December 2010

Disciplinary record

Last updated 26 July 2011

Results and fixtures

Friendlies

Scottish Premier League

Note: Due to postponements between match day 18 and match day 19 (not shown above), Motherwell's position in the Scottish Premier League dropped to 8th place. The win on match day 19 served to allow them to leapfrog the teams in 6th and 7th place while still having two games in hand.

UEFA Europa League

Scottish League Cup

Scottish Cup

Competitions

Overall

SPL

Classification

Results summary

Results by round

Results by opponent

Source: 2009–10 Scottish Premier League article

See also
 List of Motherwell F.C. seasons

Notes and references

External links
 Motherwell F.C. website
 BBC My Club page

Motherwell F.C. seasons
Motherwell